Wyethia helenioides is a species of flowering plants in the family Asteraceae commonly referred to as gray mule's ears or whitehead mule-ears.

Distribution
This species occurs chiefly in the California Coast Ranges, Transverse Ranges, Peninsular Ranges, and some areas of the Sierra Nevada foothills in California.

Description
Wyethia helenioides is a short, low growing golden-rayed wildflower, that resemble sunflowers.  Typical understory associates in sunny clearings of mixed oak forests in coastal California include Mimulus aurantiacus and Calochortus luteus.

References

External links
Jepson Manual Treatment - Wyethia helenioides

helenioides
Flora of California
Flora of the Sierra Nevada (United States)
Natural history of the California chaparral and woodlands
Flora without expected TNC conservation status